Zumrad (before 2021 — Shahrak)is a jamoat in northern Tajikistan. It is part of the city of Isfara in Sughd Region. The jamoat has a total population of 16,555 (2015). It consists of 6 villages, including Shahrak (the seat) and Chordeh.

A Chinese paramilitary base is located near the town.

Notes

References

Populated places in Sughd Region
Jamoats of Tajikistan